"Cruel" is a song by Human Nature, released as the lead single from their album second studio album Counting Down. The song peaked at No. 14 in Australia and was certified Gold. Human Nature performed the song live at the ARIA Music Awards of 1998 and on Hey Hey It's Saturday.

Track listing
 Cruel (Single Edit) (4:11)	
 Without You (LA Demo Session)	
 Cruel (Album Version) (5:16)

Charts

Weekly charts
"Cruel" debuted and peaked at No. 14 in Australia.

Year-end charts

Sales and certifications

Credits
 Arranged By [Strings] – Jamie Muhoberac, Larry Muhoberac
 Drums [Additional] – Damien Wagner
 Engineer [Additional] – Nick Brophy
 Guitar – Joel, Shep Solomon
 Mixed By – Mick Guzauski

References

1998 singles
Human Nature (band) songs
1998 songs
Sony Music Australia singles
Songs written by Sheppard Solomon
Songs written by Andrew Klippel
Pop ballads